Dark Lady is the 11th studio album by American singer-actress Cher, released in May 1974 by MCA. Cher again collaborated with Snuff Garrett as a record producer, and with Al Capps for the arrangements. 
Dark Lady was the third and final studio album for MCA. It was also the last record promoted on her successful The Sonny & Cher Comedy Hour show. After its release, the album received positive reviews from critics but, unlike her previous record produced by Garrett, was only moderately successful.

Production and composition
After the success of Half-Breed, Cher, for her final record under MCA, again chose Snuff Garrett to produce and Al Capps for arrangements. During that same year, she divorced her first husband Sonny Bono, dissolving the Sonny & Cher couple.  This ended their professional musical ties and television show for a while. Due to the success of previous albums produced by Garrett, Dark Lady followed the same narrative ballad style. She attracted many young fans during this period of her career for her style of glamour pop, and the album shows also what Cher could do back in the mid-70s, at the height of her popularity. MCA released the album with the letter E accented in Chér on the album cover. The next studio albums released by Warner Bros completely remove the stress.

The opening track of the album is a song written by Alan O'Day "Train of Thought" that had moderate success on the pop charts. Three songs from the album were written by Johnny Durrill, and the last song "Apples Don't Fall Far From The Tree" was written by Bob Stone, who wrote her first success of the 1970s, "Gypsys, Tramps & Thieves". The album also contains two covers, The Great Gatsby theme song "What'll I Do" and the 1965 Fontella Bass hit song "Rescue Me". Cher also does a tribute to Bette Midler on the retro "Miss Subway of 1952".

In August 1993, the original album was combined with Half-Breed and issued on one CD titled Half Breed/Dark Lady, this release included all the tracks from both original albums. A CD of the original Dark Lady album in its entirety has not yet been produced.

Singles 
"Dark Lady", the album's first single release, reached #1 on the Billboard Hot 100 and #2 on the Canadian Singles. The song became Cher's third solo U.S. number one hit on March 23, 1974, and her last until "Believe" twenty-five years later. It also reached #3 on the Adult Contemporary chart. "Dark Lady" reached #36 in UK single charts. After "Dark Lady" the album spawned two more singles which charted on the Billboard Hot 100 chart. The second single released was "Train of Thought" which reached #27 on the Hot 100 chart and #9 in the Adult Contemporary chart. Shortly after, "I Saw a Man and He Danced with His Wife" was released. "Rescue Me" was released as the fourth single in the US in 1975 but failed to chart.

Critical reception

Dark Lady had received positive reviews from music critics. Decades later, Peter Fawthrop of Allmusic gave it three stars and compared this album with the previous Half-Breed saying that is "more upbeat". He also said that "she was more wholesome and organic in the early '70s," and about the covers in the album "is always fun to hear Cher's renditions of the classics." Rolling Stone gave a positive review of the album, stating "this could finally be the LP that will establish Cher as a major album artist" and "she has put together a recognizable voice with fine songs, a set that flows throughout, and superb production." About Cher,  said that "she is a personality as well as a singer, so display in rock, pop and on stepdowns."

Commercial performance
Dark Lady debuted on the Billboard 200 at #191 in early June 1974. The highest position it reached was #69.
The album debuted at number ninety-eight on the Canadian Albums Chart in late June, eventually reaching its highest position at #33 in July. 
Like her previous albums, the album didn't make it to the UK album charts.

Track listing

Personnel 
 Cher - lead vocals
 Snuff Garrett - record producer
 Lennie Roberts - sound engineer
 Al Capps - arrangement assistance
 Richard Avedon - photography
 Calvin Klein - dress

Charts

References 

1974 albums
Cher albums
Albums produced by Snuff Garrett
MCA Records albums